Minthea obsita is a species of powder-post beetle in the family Bostrichidae. It is found in Africa, Europe and Northern Asia (excluding China), North America, and South America.

References

Further reading

External links

 

Bostrichidae
Articles created by Qbugbot
Beetles described in 1867